Vesey Dawson, 2nd Earl of Dartrey (22 April 1842 – 14 June 1920), styled Viscount Cremorne between 1866 and 1897, was an Irish Liberal politician.

Family and early life
Dawson was the eldest child of Richard Dawson, 1st Earl of Dartrey (then Lord Cremorne), and his wife, Augusta Stanley, daughter of Edward Stanley and Lady Mary Maitland. He became known by the courtesy title Viscount Cremorne in July 1866 upon his father's elevation to an earldom. Educated at Eton College, he later became a captain and, later still, a lieutenant-colonel in the Coldstream Guards, retiring from the British Army in 1876. In 1882, the then Lord Cremorne married Julia Georgiana Sarah Wombwell, daughter of Sir George Orby Wombwell and Lady Julia Sarah Alice Child-Villiers. Together, they had three children:
 Lady Edith Anne Dawson (1883–1974)
 Lady Mara Augusta Dawson (1887–1961)
 Richard George Dawson (1890–1894)

Political career
He was elected in the 1865 general election as one of the two Members of Parliament (MPs) for Monaghan, but stood down at the next general election, in 1868.

Lord Cremorne, as he then was, served as High Sheriff of Monaghan in 1878. 

Earl and Countess Dartrey attended the 1903 Delhi Durbar to mark the accession of King Edward VII as Emperor of India.

Peerage
Viscount Cremorne succeeded as 2nd Earl of Dartrey upon his father's death in May 1897. Upon his own death in 1920, he was succeeded by his brother, Anthony Lucius Dawson, who became 3rd Earl of Dartrey.

As Lord Dartrey, he owned around 25,000 acres of land and was a member of the Travellers' Club on Kildare Street in Dublin.

Death
Lord Dartrey died at his home, Dartrey Castle in County Monaghan, after a long illness in 1920.

References

External links
 

1842 births
1920 deaths
People educated at Eton College
Irish Liberal Party MPs
Members of the Parliament of the United Kingdom for County Monaghan constituencies (1801–1922)
UK MPs 1865–1868
UK MPs who inherited peerages
High Sheriffs of Monaghan
19th-century Irish landowners
Earls in the Peerage of the United Kingdom
20th-century Irish landowners
Vesey